The following is a list of paintings by Rembrandt in order of appearance (frontispiece and catalogue pages 3–511), that were attributed as autograph by Adolf Rosenberg and Wilhelm Reinhold Valentiner in 1908.

See also
List of paintings by Rembrandt (an updated list of attributions based on recent work by the Rembrandt Research Project)

Sources

 Rembrandt, des Meisters Gemälde in 643 Abbildungen, by W.R. Valentiner, Zweite, Dritte Auflage, Deutsche Verlags-Anstalt, Stuttgart, Berlin, und Leipzig, 1908

 
Rembrandt Paintings
Rembrandt
Rembrandt studies